Elinor Wonders Why is an animated television series created by Jorge Cham and Daniel Whiteson. The show premiered on September 7, 2020, on PBS Kids.

Plot
The exploration-themed show encourages children to follow their curiosity, ask questions when they don't understand, and find answers using science inquiry skills. The main character, Elinor, is the most observant and curious bunny rabbit in Animal Town just north of Natural Forest, California. She introduces children ages 3–6 to science, nature, and communities through adventures with her friends Olive and Ari. Each episode includes two 11-minute animated stories, plus interstitial content, where Elinor and her classmates enjoy either Señor Tapir singing about famous nature explorers or Ms. Mole reading stories.

Characters

Main
Elinor (voiced by Markeda McKay) - A white bunny girl with an inquisitive nature and a sweet personality.
Ari (voiced by Wyatt White) - A funny, imaginative light brown bat boy who lives in a hollow boulder, and is one of Elinor's best friends.
Olive (voiced by Maria Nash) - An elephant calf girl who is one of Elinor's best friends. She often makes charts for whatever questions are being asked.
Ranger Rabbit (voiced by Lisette St. Louis) - Elinor's mom, who works as a park ranger.
Mr. Rabbit (voiced by Colin Doyle) - Elinor's dad.
Ms. Mole (voiced by Shoshana Sperling) - A brown mole who is Elinor, Ari and Olive's teacher. She wears glasses.

Recurring
Olive's Mom (voiced by Ana Sani)
Señor Tapir (voiced by Juan Chioran) - A Spanish-accented tapir that sings about famous explorers and inventors during interstitials.
Mr. Raccoon (voiced by Dan Darin-Zanco) - A raccoon who runs a bakery.
Rollie (voiced by Eric Khou) - An armadillo who is one of Elinor, Ari, and Olive's classmates.
Ms. Llama (voiced by Nicole Stamp) - A llama who owns a fruit cart.
Mr. Dog (voiced by Paul Bates) - A dog who loves to bury his things into the ground.
Tito Mouse (voiced by Leo Orgil) - A mouse who is one of Elinor, Ari, and Olive's classmates.
Mr. Bat (voiced by Raoul Bhaneja) - Ari's dad.
Mr. Lion (voiced by Kevin Dennis) - A lion who likes to paint pictures.
Koa (voiced by Ian Ho) - A brown quokka who is one of Elinor, Ari, and Olive's classmates.
Camilla (voiced by Norah Adams) - A camel who is a friend of Elinor, Ari, and Olive.
Sally Beaver (voiced by Royal Goodfellow) - A beaver who is one of Elinor, Ari, and Olive's classmates.
Mary and Lizzie Goat (voiced by Abigail and Grace Oliver) - Twin goat girls who are Elinor, Ari, and Olive's classmates.
Alejandro Possum (voiced by Sergio Di Zio) - A possum whose name is never mentioned in the series.
Silas (voiced by Callum Shoniker) - A cheetah who is one of Elinor, Ari, and Olive's classmates.
Baba and Bibi (voiced by George Buza and Linda Kash) - Elinor's paternal grandparents who live in Desert Town.
Deputy Mouse (voiced by Ron Pardo)
Ms. Beaver (voiced by Diane Saleme)
Farmer Bear (voiced by Ellen Dublin)
Mrs. Tiger (voiced by Ella Jones Farlinger) - The mayor of Animal Town.
Ms. Bat (voiced by Shoshana Sperling) - Ari's mom.
Mr. Hamster (voiced by Cliff Saunders) - A hamster who is a substitute teacher in Elinor’s class.
Siggy (voiced by Simon Pirso) - A squirrel.
Lola (voiced by Elana Dunkelman) - Koa's big sister.
Mr. Beaver (voiced by Mike Petersen)
Mr. Hippo (voiced by Derek McGrath)
Mr. Antelope (voiced by Eddie Glen)
Hazel (voiced by Svea Ham) - Mr. Lion’s daughter.

Episodes

Development
Development of the show began in 2017, when Cham and Whiteson were approached by PBS. PBS found Cham's comic, Piled Higher and Deeper, online and asked if he was interested in pitching to them. "I reached out to Daniel, and what inspires us beyond science is our children," Cham recalled. "They are curious, and it motivated us to create the show." Cham cites Pogo and Calvin and Hobbes as inspiration for the show's visual design, which he described as "something that felt natural and calming, as opposed to overloaded or frenetic."

The character of Elinor was inspired by Cham's own daughter, Elinor. Cham said "She was about 4, which is just at that perfect age where she really does wonder why, all the time. Any answer you give her, she’ll (have) a follow-up question, another why." Cham and Whiteson went with animals as the show's characters to make them "appealing but also relatable at the same time", and to "highlight their range of skills and abilities."

Broadcast
The series premiered on PBS Kids in the United States on September 7, 2020, as a sneak peek by showing the first 2 episodes, before regularly airing new episodes on September 8. Some episodes are available on Amazon Prime Video in the United States.

PBS International has licensed the series to Canada, Latin America, Finland, Israel, Sweden and the United Arab Emirates via Knowledge Network, Discovery Kids, Yle, Hop!, SVT and E-Junior, respectively. The series airs on Australia on the PBS Kids channel, which was started as a venture with Foxtel in July 2021.

Home video
In early 2021, the series began to release its episodes on PBS Kids compilation DVDs.

Graphic novel series
Elinor Wonders Why: Hiding in Plain Sight, described as one of two launch titles for a graphic novel series based on the show, was announced in February 2022. Two titles, Hiding in Plain Sight and Forest Giants, released on September 6, 2022.

Reception
Starr Rhett Rocque of Fast Company wrote, "This clever series...encourages curiosity."

Awards

References

External links
 Official website
 

2020s American children's television series
2020s American animated television series
2020 American television series debuts
2020s Canadian children's television series
2020s Canadian animated television series
2020 Canadian television series debuts
2020s preschool education television series
American children's animated adventure television series
American preschool education television series
Canadian children's animated adventure television series
Canadian preschool education television series
Animated preschool education television series
English-language television shows
Science education television series
Nature educational television series
PBS Kids shows
PBS original programming
CBC Kids original programming
Animated television series about rabbits and hares
Animated television series about children
Animated television series about families
Television shows set in California